This is a list of events taking place in 2023 relating to Scottish television.

Events

January
1 January – BBC Scotland's Hogmanay is hosted by Edith Bowman to see in the New Year.

Ongoing television programmes

1960s
Reporting Scotland (1968–1983; 1984–present)

1970s
Sportscene (1975–present)
Landward (1976–present)
The Beechgrove Garden (1978–present)

1990s
Eòrpa (1993–present)

2000s
River City (2002–present)
The Adventure Show (2005–present)
An Là (2008–present)
Trusadh (2008–present)
STV Rugby (2009–2010; 2011–present)
STV News at Six (2009–present)

2010s
Scotland Tonight (2011–present)
Shetland (2013–present)
Scot Squad (2014–present)
Still Game (2016–present)
Two Doors Down (2016–present)
The Nine (2019–present)
Debate Night (2019–present)
A View from the Terrace (2019–present)

See also
2023 in Scotland

References

2023 in Scottish television
Television in Scotland by year